This list includes deans, notable alumni and faculty of NYU Grossman School of Medicine.

List of deans

John W. Draper, President of the Faculty (1850–1873)
Alfred C. Post, President of the Faculty (1873–1877)
Charles Inslee Pardee, Dean (1877–1897)
Egbert Le Fevre, Acting Dean (1897–1898)
Edward G. Janeway, Dean (1898–1905)
Egbert Le Fevre, Dean (1905–1914)
William H. Park, Acting Dean (1914–1915)
Samuel A. Brown, Dean (1915–1932)
John H. Wyckoff, Dean (1932–1937)
Currier McEwen, Dean (1937–1955)
Donal Sheehan, Acting Dean (1943–1954), Dean (1955–1960)
S. Bernard Wortis, Dean (1960–1963)
Saul J. Farber, Acting Dean (1963–1966)
Lewis Thomas, Dean (1966–1969)
Ivan L. Bennet Jr., Director-Dean (1970–1982)
Saul J. Farber, Acting Dean (1979–1987), Dean (1987–1997)
Noel L. Cohen, Interim Provost & Interim Dean (1997–1998)
Robert M. Glickman, Dean (1998–2007)
Robert I. Grossman, Dean & chief executive officer (2007–)

Notable people

Alumni
Arthur Agatston, Cardiologist, MD, 1973, author of The South Beach Diet
Naomi Amir, Pediatric neurologist, MD 1952, established first pediatric neurology clinic in Israel
Michael Baden, Anatomic and Forensic Pathologist
Sara J. Baker, Alumna class of 1917
Solomona A. Berson, Alumnus class of 1945  
Hermann M. Biggs, Alumnus Class of 1883
Martin J. Blaser, Professor, MD, 1973, established the Foundation for Bacteria
Simon R. Blatteis (1876–1968), MD 1898, New York pathologist and head of the city's public health efforts; also a faculty member of the school
Richard A. Cash, global health researcher
 Patricia Charache, MD 1957, microbiologist and infectious disease specialist
Samuel Charache, hematologist, discoverer of the first effective treatment for sickle cell disease
Stella Chess, Alumna class of 1939 
May Edward Chinn (1896–1980), first Black woman to graduate from Bellevue Hospital Medical College
James Cimino (1928–2010), Internal medicine and palliative care, co-inventor of the Cimino fistula
Douglas Cines,  MD,1972, hematologist and professor, Perelman School of Medicine at the University of Pennsylvania,
Samuel Cochran (1871–1952), medical missionary who worked in Eastern China for over 20 years
Barry S. Coller, MD, 1970, Vice President of Rockefeller University
Edward C. Franklin, (1928-1982) 
Joseph Goldberger, discovered pellagra killing thousands of southerners in the 1920s, saved millions of lives figuring out a lack of vitamin B12 caused the disease
William C. Gorgas , 22nd Surgeon General of the US Army, discovered vector of yellow fever in Panama 
Arthur Gottlieb, immunologist, AIDS researcher, professor at Tulane Medical School 
Daniel O. Griffin, MD, infectious disease specialist 
Sidney V. Haas, MD, pioneer in celiac disease research
Dr Mercy Amua-Quarshie, obstetrician-gynecologist
William A. Hammond, Alumnus Class of 1848 
Henry Drury Hatfield, MD, 1904, United States Senate (1929–1935)
William Howard Hay, 1891, Founded The East Aurora Sun and Diet Sanatorium
Kurt Hirschhorn, (1926 - still living)
Rochelle Hirschhorn
John Howland, pediatrician, MD, 1897
Elizabeth Jonas (neurologist), MD 1986, physician, neuroscientist and professor, Yale School of Medicine
Eric R. Kandel, psychoanalyst, psychiatrist, MD 1955, 2000 Nobel Prize in Physiology or Medicine
Augustus C. Kinney (1871), noted expert on tuberculosis at the turn of the 20th century
Gerald Klerman, psychiatrist and researcher
Linda Laubenstein, HIV/AIDS researcher
H. Sherwood Lawrence, (1916-2004)
Andrew Caldwell Mailer, member of the Wisconsin State Senate from 1897 to 1901
Valentino Mazzia (1922–1999), forensic anesthesiologist
Aaron E. Miller, neurologist, first chairman of the Multiple Sclerosis section of the American Academy of Neurology
Matthew Mirones, former member of the New York State Assembly
Raymond Rocco Monto, orthopedic surgeon, researcher, writer
Frank Netter, medical artist and author, MD, 1931
Norman Orentreich, MD, Dermatologist, father of modern hair transplantation, creator of Clinique, and the first president of the American Society for Dermatologic Surgery
Louis A. Perrotta, surgeon, medical researcher, academic, and hospital founder
Walter Reed, discoverer of the vector for yellow fever
Nicholas P. Restifo, immunologist researcher
Walton T. Roth, psychiatrist researcher
Albert Sabin, Medical researcher, MD, 1931, developer of the oral vaccine for polio and President of the Weizmann Institute of Science
Jonas Salk, Medical researcher, MD, 1938, discoverer of the Salk vaccine (the first polio vaccine)
Rosalyn Scott, the first African-American woman to become a thoracic surgeon
William James Wanless, MD, (F.A.C.S.) 1889
Gerald Weissmann, cell biologist, liposome discovery, rheumatologist, 1954

Current Faculty 
Steven Abramson, MD
Iannis Aifantis, PhD
Dafna Bar-Sagi, PhD, Professor of Biochemistry and Molecular Pharmacology and Chief Scientific Officer
Jef D. Boeke, PhD, National Academy of Sciences
Maurice Brodie, polio researcher
György Buzsáki, MD, PhD, National Academy of Sciences
Ken H. Cadwell, PhD, HHMI Faculty Scholars
Aravinda Chakravarti, Professor, Department of Medicine
Kathryn A. Colby, MD, PhD
Max Costa, PhD
Claude Desplan, PhD, National Academy of Sciences
Orrin Devinsky, MD 
Michael L. Dustin, PhD, AAAS
Robert J. Femia, MD
Steven Flanagan, Professor and Chairman of the Department of Rehabilitation Medicine
Robert C. Froemke, PhD, HHMI Faculty Scholars
Steven L. Galetta, MD
Aubrey C. Galloway, MD
William L. Goldberg, Assistant Professor and Assistant Director of Emergency Medicine, and published author
Lewis R. Goldfrank, MD The Herbert W. Adams Professor of Emergency Medicine, Ronald O. Perelman Department of Emergency Medicine
John G. Golfinos, MD
Dana R. Gosset, MD
Marc Gourevitch, MD, MPH
Avram Hershko, Adjunct Professor, 2004 Nobel Prize in Chemistry
Alec Kimmelman, MD, PhD
Herbert Lepor, MD
Rodolfo Llinas, Professor of Physiology & Neuroscience
Dan Littman, Professor of Microbiology and Pathology and HHMI Investigator
Catherine Scott Manno, MD
Charles Marmar, MD
Robert Montgomery, MD, DPhil
Richard P. Novick, MD, National Academy of Sciences
Evegeny Nudler, Professor of Biochemistry and Molecular Pharmacology and HHMI Investigator
Victor Nussenzweig
Seth J. Orlow, MD, PhD
Michele Pagano, Professor and Chair of Biochemistry and Molecular Pharmacology and HHMI Investigator
Michael Recht, MD
Danny Reinberg, Professor of Biochemistry and Molecular Pharmacology and HHMI Investigator
Eduardo D. Rodriguez, MD, DDS
J. Thomas Roland Jr., MD
William N. Rom, Sol and Judith Bergstein Professor of Medicine and Environmental Medicine, Emeritus
Andrew D. Rosenberg, MD
David D. Sabatini, MD, PhD, The Frederick L. Ehrman Professor Emeritus of Cell Biology and Research Professor, Department of Cell Biology
Regina Sullivan, PhD, Professor of Child & Adolescent Psychiatry 
Richard Tsien, DPhil
Jessica E. Treisman, PhD
Fred Valentine, MD, Professor of Medicine and Microbiology, co-director of the Center for AIDS Research and former head of the AIDS Clinical Trials Unit at NYU Langone Health
Jan T. Vilcek, MD, PhD 
Jeffrey N. Weiser, MD 
Joseph D. Zuckerman, surgeon-in-chief of NYU Langone Orthopedic Hospital

Former faculty 

 Baruj Benacerraf, Immunologist, Professor, (1956-1968) 1980 Nobel Prize in Physiology or Medicine
Gunning S. Bedford (1806–1870) 
 Joseph Dancis, former Chairman, Department of Pediatrics
Dr. Austin Flint Sr. (1812–1886)
Thomas Francis Jr. Francis was the first person to isolate influenza virus in the United States, discovered influenza B and mentored Jonas Salk
Dr. Alvin E. Friedman-Kien, frontline AIDS fighters
Milton Helpern (1902-1977)  
Charles S. Hirsch (1937-2016)  
William Holme Van Buren (1819-1883) 
 L. Emmett Holt Jr., former Director of Pediatrics
Saul Krugman (1911-1995) 
Alfred Lebbeus Loomis (1831-1895)  
Edith M. Lincoln (1891-1977)  
 Otto Loewi, Professor of Pharmacology, 1936 Nobel Prize in Physiology or Medicine
 William Thompson Lusk, President of the Bellevue Hospital Medical College
Colin Munro Macleod (1909-1972)  
Valentine Mott (1785-1865) 
Charles Norris (1867-1935)  
Ruth S. Nussenzweig (1928–2018) 
 Severo Ochoa, Professor (1942–1974), 1959 Nobel Prize in Physiology or Medicine
Zoltan Ovary, immunologist at New York University
Martyn Paine (1794-1877) 
Granville Sharp Pattison (1791-1851) 
Joseph P. Ransohoff, MD
John Revere (1787-1847)  
Howard A. Rusk (1901-1989)  
 Oliver Sacks, Professor of Neurology and author
John E. Sarno, Professor of Clinical Rehabilitation Medicine
Lewis A. Sayre, first Professor of Orthopedic Surgery in America
Joseph Schlessinger, Professor of Pharmacology (1990-2001)
Homer Smith (1895–1962), Professor and Director of the Physiology Laboratories at NYU
Job Lewis Smith, described by Harold Faber as the "Father of the American Pediatric Society"
Stephen Smith, Physician, MD, Founder, American Public Health Association
Frank C. Spencer (1925–2018)  
Chandler A. Stetson (1921-1977)  
Howard C. Taylor Jr (1900-1885)  
William Smith Tillet (1892-1974)  
William Welch, pathologist whose curriculum started Johns Hopkins Medical School
Arthur Zitrand, Chairman of Department of Psychiatry – died at 104. Headed psychiatry at Bellevue for at least four decades

References

Lists of people by university or college in New York City
Lists of physicians

Medicine